Kolah Jub-e Olya-ye Yek (also Romanized as Kolah Jūb-e ‘Olyā-ye Yek; also known as Kaleh Jūb-e ‘Olyā, Kolah Jūb-e Bālā, Kolāh Jūb-e Kīānī, Kolah Jūb-e ‘Olyā, and Kolah Jū ‘Olyā) is a village in Howmeh Rural District, in the Central District of Gilan-e Gharb County, Kermanshah Province, Iran. At the 2006 census, its population was 223, in 46 families.

References 

Populated places in Gilan-e Gharb County